Self-portrait as the Apostle Paul is one of over 40 painted self-portraits by Rembrandt, painted in 1661 by the Dutch artist Rembrandt. It is now in the Rijksmuseum in Amsterdam.

Bibliography 
 Christian Tümpel: Rembrandt. Rowohlt Taschenbuch Verlag, Reinbek 2006. . 
 Michael Kitson: Rembrandt. Phaidon Press Inc., New York City 2007. .

External links

 Self-portrait as the Apostle Paul, Rembrandt Harmensz. van Rijn, 1661

1661 paintings
Paintings in the collection of the Rijksmuseum
Self-portraits by Rembrandt
Paintings depicting Paul the Apostle